The Machine That Changed the World (1992) (broadcast under the alternative title "The Dream Machine" in the UK, with different narration) is a 5-episode television series on the history of electronic digital computers.  It was written and directed by Nancy Linde, and produced by WGBH Television of Boston, Massachusetts, and the British Broadcasting Corporation.  Backers included the Association for Computing Machinery, the National Science Foundation, and the UNISYS Corporation.

The first three episodes deal with the history of fully electronic general-purpose digital computers from the ENIAC through desktop microcomputers.  The pre-history of such machines is examined in the first episode ("Giant Brains"), and includes a discussion of the contributions of Charles Babbage, Ada Lovelace, Alan Turing, and others.  The fourth episode ("The Thinking Machine") explores the topic of artificial intelligence.  The fifth episode ("The World at Your Fingertips") explores the then-newly-emerging worldwide networking of computers.  All episodes begin and end with a song by Peter Howell, "Stellae matutinae radius exoritur" ("The morning star's ray arises") and are narrated by long-time Frontline narrator Will Lyman.

External links

Video resource guide at American University Computing History Museum
Episode synopses at Virginia Tech
Synopsis of Episode 1, "Giant Brains" at waxy.org
Synopsis of Episode 2, "Inventing the Future", at waxy.org
Synopsis of Episode 3, "The Paperback Computer", at waxy.org 
Synopsis of Episode 4, "The Thinking Machine", at waxy.org
Synopsis of Episode 5, "The World at Your Fingertips", at waxy.org

1990s American documentary television series
Documentary television series about computing